Aldamar P. Elder (August 17, 1854 – December  31, 1951) was an American politician and businessman.

Born in Kenduskeag, Maine, Elder moved with his parents to Kansas. Elder was a businessman in Ottawa, Kansas. In 1911, Elder served as a Democrat in the Kansas House of Representatives. In 1915, President Woodrow Wilson appointed Elder postmaster of Ottawa, Kansas. His father was Peter Percival Elder who was the Lieutenant Governor of Kansas and a member of the Kansas Legislature. He died in Ottawa, Kansas.

Aldamar Elder was the chief of the Ottawa fire department from 1885 to 1898, and served as president of the Kansas State Firemen's Association in 1897.

Family life
Elder married Clara M. Maxwell (1859-1909), daughter of lawyer William Maxwell, in 1876. They had three children: Raymond (1877-1948), Pierre (1884-1959), and Clara (1885-1940). Elder married Mabel Gowdy (1876-1915) in 1913; they had two children, Damar (1915-1916) and Martha (1915-1998).

Notes

1854 births
1951 deaths
People from Kenduskeag, Maine
People from Ottawa, Kansas
Businesspeople from Kansas
Democratic Party members of the Kansas House of Representatives